The 2009 All-Ireland Intermediate Hurling Championship was the 26th staging of the All-Ireland hurling championship. The started on 31 May 2015 and ended on 29 August 2009.

Kilkenny were the defending champions, however, they were defeated in the final by Cork who won the title by 2-23 to 0-16.

Team summaries

Results

Leinster Intermediate Hurling Championship

Munster Intermediate Hurling Championship

All-Ireland Intermediate Hurling Championship

Statistics

Top scorers

Overall

Single game

References

Intermediate
All-Ireland Intermediate Hurling Championship